Faucett is a census-designated place in southern Buchanan County, Missouri, United States. It is located sixteen miles north of Platte City on Interstate 29 (Missouri)/U.S. Route 71. The community is part of the St. Joseph, MO–KS Metropolitan Statistical Area. The population was 248 at the 2020 census.

Faucett derives its name from Robert Faucett, who was a local miller when the Chicago Great Western Railroad established the community in 1890. A post office called Faucett has been in operation since 1891.

The community's most notable landmark is the Farris Truck Stop on Interstate 29, which has a 1974 Peterbilt truck, with a 1965 Fruehauf trailer standing 50 feet high to advertise the truck stop. The truck stop closed in 2021, however, the sign still remains as a landmark. 

The township has a private airport, "Farris Strip", that was built by the late Edwin "Dump" Farris. The airport was built in the 1950s and originally had a runway length of 1800'. The runway was later expanded to the current length of 2100'. During the airport's peak success, several businesses were located on the field. These included flight instruction, aircraft rental/sales, and aerial applicators ("crop dusters"). At one time the airport had 99 students actively learning to fly.

The second highest (behind Ste. Genevieve) number of meteorites in the state of Missouri have been found around the community (100 kg.), with most believed to have fallen in

Demographics

Notable person
Esther George, president of the Federal Reserve Bank of Kansas City

References

Unincorporated communities in Buchanan County, Missouri
St. Joseph, Missouri metropolitan area
Unincorporated communities in Missouri